Independent Schools Association may refer to:
 Independent Schools Association (Australia), a grouping of schools primarily based in Sydney, Australia, for the purposes of sporting competitions
 Independent Schools Association (UK), one of the oldest of the independent schools’ organisations in the UK. The association is a constituent association of the Independent Schools Council
 Independent Schools Association of Southern Africa, the largest and oldest association of independent schools in Southern Africa